George W. Lowe (1847 - ?) was a minister and served as a member of the Arkansas House of Representatives. He represented Monroe County, Arkansas and served in the 1889 and 1891 sessions.

Lowe was born in Hardeman County, Tennessee and was a servant until he was 15. In 1863 he became a soldier as chief musician and was discharged in 1866 when he returned home to Hardeman County.

He served as a minister in Holly Grove, Arkansas and was involved in emigration efforts in 1892. Emigration was seen as a way to escape discrimination.

References

People from Hardeman County, Tennessee
Members of the Arkansas House of Representatives
1847 births
Year of death missing